The 2007 Cheltenham Gold Cup was a horse race which took place at the Cheltenham Racecourse on Friday March 16, 2007. It was the 79th running of the Cheltenham Gold Cup, and it was won by the pre-race favourite Kauto Star. The winner was ridden by Ruby Walsh and trained by Paul Nicholls.

Earlier in the season Kauto Star had won the first two legs of the Betfair Million, the Betfair Chase and the King George VI Chase. The Gold Cup was the final leg, and his victory earned a bonus prize of £1,000,000.

Race details
 Sponsor: Totesport
 Winner's prize money: £242,335.00
 Going: Good to Soft
 Number of runners: 18
 Winner's time: 6m 40.46s

Full result

* The distances between the horses are shown in lengths or shorter. shd = short-head; PU = pulled-up; UR = unseated rider.† Trainers are based in Great Britain unless indicated.

Winner's details
Further details of the winner, Kauto Star:

 Foaled: March 19, 2000 in France
 Sire: Village Star; Dam: Kauto Relka (Port Etienne)
 Owner: Clive D. Smith
 Breeder: Marie-Louise Aubert

References
 
 sportinglife.com
 telegraph.co.uk – "Kauto Star wins Gold Cup" – March 17, 2007.

Cheltenham Gold Cup
 2007
Cheltenham Gold Cup
Cheltenham Gold Cup
2000s in Gloucestershire